The  (UNU) is the think tank and academic arm of the United Nations. Headquartered in Shibuya, Tokyo, Japan, with diplomatic status as a UN institution, its mission is to help resolve global issues related to human development and welfare through collaborative research and education. 

In 1969, UN Secretary-General U Thant proposed "the establishment of a United Nations university, truly international and devoted to the Charter objectives of peace and progress". Following three annual sessions discussing the matter, the United Nations General Assembly (UNGA) approved the founding of the United Nations University in December 1972. Tokyo was chosen as the main location due to the Japanese government's commitment to provide facilities and $100 million to the UNU endowment fund. The United Nations University was formally inaugurated in January 1975 as the world's first international university.

Since 2010, UNU has been authorized by the UNGA to grant postgraduate degrees, offering several master's and doctoral programs. The university's research officially priorities three thematic areas: peace and governance; global development and inclusion; and environment, climate and energy. UNI also facilitates the UN's engagement with academic institutions and policymakers around the world, in part through campuses, programmes, and affiliated institutes spanning twelve countries.

Organisation and leadership

The university is headed by a rector, who holds the rank of Under-Secretary-General of the United Nations.

To date, there have been six Rectors at UNU. The current Rector, since March 2013, is Dr. David M. Malone of Canada.

On 27 July 2022 the UNU announced that Tshilidzi Marwala of South Africa would take over as rector from 1 March 2023.

List of rectors 

The Council of UNU is the governing board of the University and is composed of 12 members who are appointed by the Secretary-General of the United Nations with the concurrence of the Director-General of UNESCO.

History

The University was formally established in 1972 and began its activities in 1975 following the signature of the permanent headquarters agreement between the United Nations and Japan. The creation of the United Nations University was set in motion by Secretary-General U Thant in 1969.

UNU Institutes and Vice-Rectorate
Over the years, several Institutes of UNU were created to help with the research initiatives of the United Nations. Most notably, in 2007, a vice-rectorate was established in Bonn (UNU-ViE), Germany, as a way of strengthening UNU's presence in Europe.

UNU as a degree-granting institution

In December 2009, the UN General Assembly amended the UNU Charter to make it possible for UNU to "grant and confer master's degrees and doctorates, diplomas, certificates and other academic distinctions under conditions laid down for that purpose in the statutes by the Council."

In 2013, the UNU Institute for Sustainability and Peace (UNU-ISP) in Tokyo announced its intention to seek accreditation from the National Institution for Academic Degrees and University Evaluation (NIAD-UE), which is the Japanese accreditation agency for higher education institutions. In 2014, UNU-ISP was consolidated with UNU Institute of Advanced Studies in Yokohama to form the UNU Institute for the Advanced Study of Sustainability (UNU-IAS). UNU-IAS was formally accredited in April 2015, making it the first international organization to be recognized by the NIAD-UE.

In 2014, UNU-MERIT, in collaboration with Maastricht University, started to grant a double-degree Master of Science in Public Policy and Human Development. In 2018, the programme was re-accredited by the Accreditation Organisation of the Netherlands and Flanders (NVAO) and received the official EAPAA accreditation by the European Association for Public Administration Accreditation.

Locations
The university has several campuses spread over five continents. Its headquarters are located at the UNU Centre in Tokyo, Japan.

Research 

The role of the UN University is to generate new knowledge, educate, enhance individual and institutional capacities, and disseminate its useful information to relevant audiences. Between 2020 and 2024, the University will be guided by the following four overarching objectives:

 Pursue policy-relevant programming: by continuing to make policy considerations central to its research programmes and, in addition, actively shaping policy agendas through targeted and strategic collaborations.
 Invest in a dynamic, innovative, and diverse institutional culture: by encouraging innovation in all dimensions of the University’s work, which is undertaken by a diverse and gender- balanced community of scholars, communicators, and management professionals, and by promoting collaboration across spatial and disciplinary boundaries.
 Strengthen collaboration, communications, and visibility: by leveraging the expertise and networks spread across the UNU system, promoting collaboration, impactful communications undertakings, and ensuring that UNU research meets actual demands.
 Strive for financial sustainability across UNU’s architecture: by addressing the financial constraints that would otherwise undermine ambitious, long-term, research planning, and ensure through participatory management practices that fundraising objectives are realistic, achievable, and complement other strategic priorities. 

As prescribed in the United Nations University Strategic Plan 2020–2024, the UN University's academic work fall within three thematic areas:

Peace and security
Social change and economic development
Environment, climate, and energy. 

Collectively, these thematic clusters define the programme space within which the UN University undertakes its academic activities. Some key perspectives (such as gender equality, human rights and sustainability) pervade all aspects of the UN University's work.

Institutes and Programmes 
The academic work of the United Nations University is carried out by a global system of Institutes, Operating Units, and Programmes located in 12 countries around the world.

Institutes

 Centre for Policy Research (UNU-CPR) in New York, USA
 Institute on Comparative Regional Integration Studies (UNU-CRIS) in Bruges, Belgium
 Institute for Environment and Human Security (UNU-EHS) in Bonn, Germany
 Institute for Integrated Management of Material Fluxes and of Resources (UNU-FLORES) in Dresden, Germany
 Institute for the Advanced Study of Sustainability (UNU-IAS) in Tokyo, Japan
 International Institute for Global Health (UNU-IIGH) in Kuala Lumpur, Malaysia
 Institute for Natural Resources in Africa (UNU-INRA) in Accra, Ghana
 Institute for Water, Environment and Health (UNU-INWEH) in Hamilton, Canada
 Institute in Macau (UNU Macau) in Macau, China
 Maastricht Economic and Social Research and Training Institute on Innovation and Technology (UNU-MERIT) in Maastricht, The Netherlands
 World Institute for Development Economics Research (UNU-WIDER) in Helsinki, Finland

Operating Units
Operating Unit on Policy-Driven Electronic Governance (UNU-EGOV) in Guimarães, Portugal

Programmes
 Programme for Biotechnology in Latin America and the Caribbean (UNU-BIOLAC) in Caracas, Venezuela

Former 

International Institute for Software Technology (UNU-IIST) in Macau, China (was closed in 2012, later gave origin to UNU-EGOV in 2014 and UNU-CS in 2016)
Institute on Computing and Society (UNU-CS) in Macau, China
Institute for Sustainability and Peace (UNU-ISP) in Tokyo, Japan (was combined with UNU Institute of Advanced Studies to form UNU-IAS in 2014)
Food and Nutrition Programme for Human and Social Development (UNU-FNP) in Ithaca, United States
 Fisheries Training Programme (UNU-FTP) in Reykjavik, Iceland
 Geothermal Training Programme (UNU-GTP) in Reykjavik, Iceland
 Land Restoration Training Programme (UNU-LRT) in Reykjavik, Iceland
 International Gender Equality Studies Training Programme (UNU-GEST) in Reykjavik, Iceland
 Institute on Globalization, Culture and Mobility (UNU-GCM) in Barcelona, Spain

See also
Akino Memorial Research Fellowship
United Nations Institute for Training and Research
United Nations University Press
University for Peace
World Maritime University

References

External links

 United Nations University Headquarters
 United Nations University Vice-Rectorate in Europe (UNU-ViE)
 United Nations University Office in Paris (UNU-OP)
 United Nations University Office in New York (UNU-ONY)

Video clips
 UNU Video Portal
 UNU YouTube channel
 UNU Vimeo channel

 
Buildings and structures in Shibuya
Intergovernmental universities
Peace and conflict studies
United Nations General Assembly subsidiary organs
Universities and colleges in Tokyo
Universities created by intergovernmental organizations
United Nations Development Group
Research institutes in the United Nations System
Japan and the United Nations